Paul W. Brier is a retired United States Marine Corps major general.   A combat veteran of the Persian Gulf, Iraq, and Afghanistan wars, he retired on 31 December 2016, completing 36 years of military service. 
He holds a BS in Civil Engineering from the Virginia Military Institute and a Master of Strategic Studies from the U.S. Army War College. A 2012 CAPSTONE Fellow at the National Defense University, he is a graduate of the Defense Resources Management Institute, Naval Postgraduate School; Air War College; Joint Forces Staff College; and Marine Corps Command and Staff College.

Military service
Brier attended the Virginia Military Institute on the four-year Navy ROTC Scholarship (Marine Option) program, graduating in 1981 with a BS in Civil Engineering. He was commissioned a second lieutenant in the United States Marine Corps. After completing The Basic School and the U.S. Army Field Artillery Officer Basic Course, his first operational assignment was with the 7th Marine Amphibious Brigade, 29 Palms, California.

In 1984 he transferred to the 12th Marine Corps District for duty as the Officer Selection Officer, Seattle.

During his command of Battery H, the unit mobilized and attached to 1st Battalion, 11th Marines, 1st Marine Division, I Marine Expeditionary Force (MEF), and conducted combat operations with Task Force Papa Bear during Operation Desert Shield and Operation Desert Storm in Saudi Arabia and Kuwait.

Promoted to major in 1993, he joined the 4th Civil Affairs Group as a Civil Affairs Team Commander, where he supported the 24th Marine Expeditionary Unit (Special Operations Capable) and the U.S. Atlantic Command Joint Overseas Training Program in Jamaica and the Bahamas. 
 
In 1996, Brier was assigned as the Operations Officer and Executive Officer, 3rd Battalion, 14th Marines, and deployed the battalion to northern Norway for NATO Exercises Strong Resolve 98.

Upon promotion to lieutenant colonel in 1998, he transferred to the II MEF Augmentation Command Element and served as II Marine Expeditionary Force Current Operations Fires Officer for a second winter deployment to Norway for NATO Exercise Battle Griffin 99.  
 
In 2000, Brier assumed command of 3rd Battalion, 14th Marines.

In 2002, he transferred to the U.S. Joint Forces Command for duty as Chief, Civil Affairs Branch, Joint Warfighting Center.  
  
Promoted to colonel in 2003, he served at the Pentagon as a Marine Corps Service Planner, Joint Staff Branch, where he assisted the Commandant of the Marine Corps in preparing for meetings of the Joint Chiefs of Staff.  In July 2004, he graduated from the International Joint Operations Planning Course at HMS Dryad (Southwick Park, England).

In February 2005, Brier was selected to build and command the 6th Civil Affairs Group (6th CAG), a provisional unit commissioned for service in Operation Iraqi Freedom. The 6th CAG provided civil affairs support for the 2d Marine Division and Multi-National Force West’s counterinsurgency operations in al-Anbar province during Operations Sayeed II, Steel Curtain, Liberity Express and Patriot Shield II and for two major national elections; the 15 Nov 2005 National Constitutional Referendum and the 15 December 2006 Parliament Elections.

In 2007, Brier  was assigned as Chief of Staff, 2d Marine Division.

In 2008, he deployed to Afghanistan and served as Officer-in-Charge, US Marine Forces Central Command (MARCENT) Coordination Element- Afghanistan; and MARCENT Liaison Officer to CJTF-101, Combined Security Assistance Force-Afghanistan,  and NATO’s International Security Assistance Force.  He held this position until selected by the Commandant of the Marine Corps to redeploy to Guam in July 2008 to establish a permanent Marine Liaison Office to coordinate the move of Marine personnel and facilities from Okinawa to the island required by the Defense Policy Review Initiative (DPRI (2005)), a bilateral force-posture realignment program between the U.S. and Japanese governments. He assisted the Governor of Guam and his government in developing the island’s civil infrastructure plans to support a thirty-percent increase in population caused by the planned relocation about 8,000 Marines and 9,000 dependents from Okinawa to Guam by 2014, estimated to cost $15 billion.

Promoted to Brigadier General in 2009, Brier commanded U.S. Marine Corps Forces Europe and  U.S. Marine Corps Forces Africa.

Brier was promoted to major general in 2013 while serving as the vice commander, U.S. Marine Corps Forces Command, Norfolk, Virginia.

As a Major General, Brier served at the Pentagon as the Assistant Deputy Commandant for Plans, Policies, and Operations, before taking command of the 20,000 Marines and sailors of the 4th Marine Division. On July 16, 2015, Battery M, 3rd Battalion, 14 Marines, 4th Marine Division was attacked by a domestic terrorist in Chattanooga.

In 2016, he returned from his final tour in Afghanistan where he had served as the Deputy Commander for Civil Outreach and Director of the Advise and Assist Directorate for the 41-nation NATO-led Resolute Support Mission (Operation Freedom’s Sentinel).

Post Military Service
He serves as the Assistant Circuit Executive for Space and Facilities for the U.S. Courts of the Fourth Circuit and volunteers as a coach/mentor for the U.S. Naval Academy's Command and Seamanship (Offshore Sail Training) Squadron and as a U.S. Coast Guard Auxiliarist.

Awards and decorations

References

External links

1959 births
United States Marine Corps personnel of the Iraq War
United States Marine Corps personnel of the War in Afghanistan (2001–2021)
United States Army War College alumni
Living people
Recipients of the Defense Superior Service Medal
Recipients of the Legion of Merit
Virginia Military Institute alumni
United States Marine Corps generals
Recipients of the Navy Distinguished Service Medal
People from Fort Ord, California
United States Court of Appeals for the Fourth Circuit